The $64,000 Question was a British quiz show based on the US format of the same name that originally ran from 19 May 1956 to 18 January 1958 produced by ATV and was originally hosted by Jerry Desmonde, and called simply The 64,000 Question with the top prize initially being 64,000 sixpences (£1,600), later doubling to 64,000 shillings (£3,200). After a successful pilot was shot on 15 November 1989, the programme was revived the following year with Bob Monkhouse as the host and a higher £6,400 top prize.

Format

Original (1956-1958)
Each contestant answered questions based on their subject of expertise. The first question earned 100 sixpences (£2 and 10 shillings), correctly answering the next question added £10 to the player's winnings. Each of the next two questions featured two parts and answering both parts doubled the player's winnings to 1,000 sixpences (£25) and 2,000 sixpences (£50) respectively. The remaining questions featured three parts, then four parts, five parts, six parts, and the final question required at least seven parts to be answered correctly to win the top prize. In late 1956, the values doubled so that the values started at £5 (100 shillings) and increased to £3,200 (64,000 shillings). £3,200 was higher, in real terms (i.e. accounting for inflation), than anything on offer on British TV for most of the 1960s, 1970s and 1980s, after the Independent Television Authority (later the Independent Broadcasting Authority) imposed prize limits on game shows after the general discrediting of the genre following the quiz show scandals in the US and rumours that the British version of Twenty One was also corrupt. On 18 January 1958, the original version ceased operations for good after 85 episodes were produced.

Revival (1990-1993)
The values started at £1, followed by questions valued at £25 and doubled with each subsequent question with £400 and £1,600 each being guaranteed. The £200 and £400 questions each featured two parts. The £800 question required three correct answers and the next question required four correct answers to secure £1,600. The contestant must then answer a follow-up question to attempt the five-part £3,200 question in a soundproof booth known as the "Isolator". The £6,400 question required six parts to answer correctly. On the £3,200 and £6,400 questions, missing one part required the contestant to answer a "reserve part" correctly. £6,400 was a significant amount of money for a British game show at that time, though still probably worth less than the original had, which was £3,200. The 1991 series replaced the £1-£50 questions with the Basic 64 which started at one pound and doubled up to 64 guaranteed pounds before the £100 question. In 1993, prize limits were lifted by the Independent Television Commission, paving the way for the eventual arrival of Who Wants to be a Millionaire? in which the eleventh question was worth £64,000 until the format of the show changed in August 2007. With the 2018 revival the £64,000 level was reintroduced. On 29 August 1993, the revival version ceased operations for good after 52 episodes were produced.

Transmissions

ATV (1956–1958)

Note: None of the ATV episodes survived.

Central (1990–1993)

References

External links

1956 British television series debuts
1993 British television series endings
1950s British game shows
1990s British game shows
Black-and-white British television shows
English-language television shows
ITV game shows
Television shows produced by Associated Television (ATV)
Television shows produced by Central Independent Television
Television series by ITV Studios
British television series revived after cancellation